The Neptune Festival is an annual festival in Virginia Beach, Virginia. Virginia Beach Chamber of Commerce President and RK Chevrolet founder Richard Kline created the idea in 1973, to celebrate the heritage of the city. The first celebration took place in 1974.

The Virginian-Pilot Beacon reported attendance of about 50,000 people at the first festival, with seafood selling out before the festival ended. Actor Lyle Waggoner from The Carol Burnett Show was the Grand Marshal of the parade.

The statue was dedicated on September 30, 2005 during the Neptune Festival Boardwalk weekend.

The Boardwalk Weekend includes the International Sandsculpting Championship, Art & Craft Show, food, and live music. It also includes a surfing contest, a foot race, a volleyball tournament, and a parade. The event is free and open to the public, with the exception of a tent-covered viewing fee of the sand sculptures.

While it is a prominent and lucrative festival, the Neptune Festival was embroiled in a gender discrimination controversy in November 2020 when a male high school junior’s application was rejected, because the “royal court” only allows for the participation of high school girls and adult men. The issue was resolved in March 2021 when the festival changed its policy and admitted its first "Prince".

References

External links 
 

Festivals in Virginia
Culture of Virginia Beach, Virginia
Tourist attractions in Virginia Beach, Virginia
1973 establishments in Virginia
Festivals established in 1973